The California Library Association (CLA) is a body of librarians that represents and promotes the interests of librarians and library sciences in the state of California. The association is managed by a board of directors, consisting of 15 members. The members are elected for a term of 3 years, and elections are conducted every year for 2 or 3 positions.

The annual California Library Association Conference is organised by the CLA.

References

Professional associations based in the United States
Library-related professional associations
Non-profit organizations based in California
Political advocacy groups in the United States
Organizations established in 1895
california